DZBS-TV, channel 12, is a television station of Radio Philippines Network. Its studios are located at Session Rd., Baguio and the transmitter is located at Mt. Sto. Tomas, Tuba, Benguet.

Areas of coverage
Baguio
Benguet

Previously aired programs
Kapampangan News (via CNN PH national feed)
Itanong Mo Kay Soriano

See also 
 Radio Philippines Network
 List of Radio Philippines Network affiliate stations

References

Television channels and stations established in 1961
Radio Philippines Network stations
Television stations in Baguio